Naomi Chance (born Naomi Freeman, December 1927 – 18 March 2003) was an English film and television actress. Chance was at one time married to the film director Guy Hamilton.
She appeared in many television shows, including The Plane Makers, (Joyce Pender); five times in Compact, (Harriet Stone); The Newcomers (Amelia Huntley); once in each of the 1970s television shows, The Sweeney, (Miss. Fay Mayhew); Within These Walls, (Jean Betts); The Hanged Man; (Jane Cowley), and many others, from the 1950s onwards.

Filmography

Personal life
Chance married director Guy Hamilton in 1953; they later divorced (Hamilton remarried in 1964).

Her second husband was a retired naval surgeon, with whom she lived in Devon.

References

External links

1927 births
2003 deaths
English film actresses
English television actresses
People from Bath, Somerset